The Carnegie School is a school of economic thought originally formed at the Graduate School of Industrial Administration (GSIA), the current Tepper School of Business, of Carnegie Institute of Technology, the current Carnegie Mellon University, especially during the 1950s to 1970s. 

Faculty at the Graduate School of Industrial Administration are known for formulating two "seemingly incompatible" concepts: bounded rationality and rational expectations. Bounded rationality was developed by Herbert A. Simon, along with James March, Richard Cyert and Oliver Williamson. Rational expectations were developed by John F. Muth and later popularized by Robert Lucas Jr., Thomas Sargent, Leonard Rapping, and others.

Depending on author and context, the term "Carnegie School" can refer to either both branches or only the bounded rationality branch, sometimes with the qualifier "Carnegie School of organization theory". The commonality between both branches is the use of dynamic optimization and forecasting techniques derived from production theory, and the early use of computers to solve planning and optimization problems. Along with other, mostly Midwestern universities, the rational expectations branch is considered part of freshwater economics, while the bounded rationality branch has been credited with originating behavioral economics and economics of organization.

History 
The Graduate School of Industrial Administration (GSIA) at the Carnegie Institute of Technology (CIT) in Pittsburgh, Pennsylvania was founded in the late 1940s, after receiving a grant by William Larimer Mellon Sr. to enable graduate instruction in business and economics for the engineers the CIT already produced. This superseded an initial attempt to "restart" the economics department, which had lapsed during World War II. The founding dean was George Leland Bach, and among the first faculty hires were William W. Cooper and Herbert A. Simon. Other early appointees included Abraham Charnes, Richard Cyert, James G. March, Franco Modigliani and Merton Miller. 

GSIA was set up as a "new look" business school, moving beyond the case-based method of instruction popularized by Harvard Business School to incorporate scientific methods of management. The economics faculty was the folded into the business school.

Scope 
The focus of the research was on organizational behavior and the application of decision analysis, management science, and psychology as well as theories such as bounded rationality to the understanding of the organization and the firm.

"The astonishing thing about Carnegie is that it joined two fundamental and seemingly incompatible strands of research. One dealt with bounded rationality, organization theory, and behavioral economics. The leading members of that group were Herbert Simon, Richard Cyert, and James March. The second strand dealt with rational expectations and efficient markets. Members of that group include Franco Modigliani (…), John Muth, Merton Miller, and Allan Meltzer, to be joined later by Robert Lucas (…), Thomas Sargent (…), and Edward Prescott." — Oliver Williamson

People 
GSIA faculty with notable contributions to their field included later Nobel Laureates in Economic Sciences Herbert A. Simon (1978), Franco Modigliani (1985), Merton Miller (1990), Robert Lucas Jr (1995), Edward C. Prescott & Finn E. Kydland (jointly 2004), and Lars Peter Hansen (2013). In addition, later Nobel Laureates Oliver Williamson (2009) and Dale Mortensen (2010) attended GSIA as Ph.D. students. John F. Muth, while heavily favored to receive the Prize for his pioneering work on rational expectations, was not included in 1995 or any other year thereafter. 

The organizational branch included James G. March along with later GSIA dean and university president Richard Cyert and graduate students Oliver Williamson, William Starbuck and Victor Vroom.

A number of later Turing Award recipients also had their roots at GSIA, before the Carnegie Mellon School of Computer Science was founded in 1968. These include Alan Perlis (1966, the inaugural recipient), Allen Newell & Herbert A. Simon (jointly 1975), and Edward Feigenbaum (1994, jointly with Raj Reddy). 

The interdisciplinary approach featured faculty at Carnegie Mellon's modern departments of economics, business, computer science, design, public policy, psychology, statistics and data science, and social and decision sciences.

Herbert Simon (1988) and his frequent collaborators Abraham Charnes and William Cooper (both 1982, jointly with Carnegie physicist Richard J. Duffin) also received the John von Neumann Theory Prize for their pioneering contributions to operations research and management science. Statistician Carlton E. Lemke (1978, jointly 
with John Forbes Nash Jr., a Carnegie undergraduate), who wrote his dissertation at GSIA under Abraham Charnes, preceded all four.

Publications 
Highly influential books published by researchers at the Carnegie School include, in chronological order: 
 Administrative Behavior (1947) by Herbert A. Simon. 
 Organizations (1959) by James G. March and Herbert A. Simon.
 Planning Production, Inventory and Work Force (1960) by Charles A. Holt, Franco Modigliani, John F. Muth, and Herbert A. Simon.
 Management Models and Industrial Applications of Linear Programming (1961) by Abraham Charnes and William W. Cooper.
 A Behavioral Theory of the Firm (1963) by Richard M. Cyert and James G. March.
 The Relative Stability of Monetary Velocity and the Investment Multiplier (1964) by Abert K. Ando and Franco Modigliani.
 The Carnegie Tech Management Game (1964) by Kalman J. Cohen, William R. Dill, Alfred A. Kuehn and Peter R. Winters
 Theory of the Firm: Resource Allocation in a Market Economy (1965) by Kalman J. Cohen and Richard M. Cyert.
 Human Problem Solving (1972) by Allen Newell and Herbert A. Simon.

In addition to the books, a number of articles authored or co-authored by members of the Carnegie school became foundational within their fields.

 "A Linear Decision Rule for Production and Employment Scheduling" (1955) by Charles C. Holt, Franco Modigliani, and Herbert A. Simon, Management Science.
 "Dynamic Programming Under Uncertainty with a Quadratic Criterion Function" (1956) by Herbert A. Simon, Econometrica.
 "Forecasting Seasonals and Trends by Exponentially Weighted Moving Averages" (1957) by Charles C. Holt, Office of Naval Research Report #52, reprint (2004) International Journal of Forecasting.
 "Derivation of a Linear Decision Rule for Production and Employment" (1958) by Charles C. Holt, Franco Modigliani, and John F. Muth, Management Science.
 "The Cost of Capital, Corporation Finance and the Theory of Investment" (1958) by Franco Modigliani and Merton H. Miller, American Economic Review.
 "Forecasting Sales by Exponentially Weighted Moving Averages" (1960) by Peter R. Winters, Management Science.
 "Rational Expectations and the Theory of Price Movements" (1961) by John F. Muth, Econometrica''.

References

External links 
 

Carnegie Mellon University
Schools of economic thought